The Nazarenes (or Nazoreans; Greek: Ναζωραῖοι, Nazōraioi) were an early Jewish Christian sect in first-century Judaism. The first use of the term is found in the Acts of the Apostles of the New Testament, where Paul the Apostle is accused of being a ringleader of the sect of the Nazarenes ("") before the Roman procurator Antonius Felix at Caesarea Maritima by Tertullus. At that time, the term simply designated followers of Jesus of Nazareth, as the Hebrew term , and the Arabic term نَصْرَانِي, still do.

As time passed, the term came to refer to a sect of Jewish Christians who continued to observe the Torah along with Noachide gentiles who were grafted into the covenant, in contrast to gentile Christians who eschewed Torah observance. They are described by Epiphanius of Salamis and are mentioned later by Jerome and Augustine of Hippo. The writers made a distinction between the Nazarenes of their time and the "Nazarenes" mentioned in Acts 24:5.

Nazarene (title)

The English term Nazarene is commonly used to translate two related Greek words that appear in the New Testament: Nazōraios ("Nazorean") and Nazarēnos ("Nazarene"). The term Nazōraios may have a religious significance instead of denoting a place of origin, while Nazarēnos is an adjectival form of the phrase apo Nazaret "from Nazareth."<ref>Frank Ely Gaebelein, James Dixon Douglas The Expositor's Bible commentary: with the New International Version 1984 "Matthew certainly used Nazōraios as an adjectival form of apo Nazaret ("from Nazareth" or "Nazarene"), even though the more acceptable adjective is Nazarēnos (cf. Bonnard, Brown, Albright and Mann, Soares Prabhu)."</ref>

Because of this, the phrases traditionally rendered as "Jesus of Nazareth" can also be translated as "Jesus the Nazarene" or "Jesus the Nazorean." In the New Testament, the form Nazōraios or Nazaraios is more common than Nazarēnos (meaning "from Nazareth").

The Sect of the Nazarenes (1st century)

The Greek epithet Nazōraios is applied to Jesus 14 times in the New Testament, and is used once in Acts to refer to the sect of Christians of which Paul was a leader. It is traditionally translated as "a man from Nazareth"; the plural Nazōraioi would mean "men from Nazareth". The title is first applied to the Christians by Tertullus, though Herod Agrippa II uses the term "Christians" which had first been used at Antioch. The name used by Tertullus survives into Mishnaic and modern Hebrew as notzrim a standard Hebrew term for "Christian", the name also exist in the Quran and modern Arabic as  naṣārā (plural of  naṣrānī "Christian"). 

Jerome too records that, in the synagogues, the word "Nazarenes" was used to describe Christians. Eusebius, around 311 CE, records that the name "Nazarenes" had formerly been used of Christians.Epiphanius Panarion 29  The use relating to a specific "sect" of Christians does not occur until Epiphanius. According to Arnold Ehrhardt, just as Antioch coined the term Christians, so Jerusalem coined the term Nazarenes, from Jesus of Nazareth.

The terms "sect of the Nazarenes" and "Jesus of Nazareth" both employ the adjective nasraya (ܕܢܨܪܝܐ) in the Syrian Aramaic Peshitta, from Nasrat (ܢܨܪܬ) for Nazareth.

The Nazarenes (4th century)

According to Epiphanius in his Panarion, the 4th-century Nazarenes (Ναζωραῖοι) were originally Jewish converts of the Apostles who fled Jerusalem because of Jesus' prophecy of its coming siege (during the First Jewish–Roman War in 70 CE). They fled to Pella, Peraea (northeast of Jerusalem), and eventually spread outwards to Beroea (Aleppo) and Basanitis, where they permanently settled (Panarion 29.3.3).

The Nazarenes were similar to the Ebionites, in that they considered themselves Jews, maintained an adherence to the Law of Moses. They rejected all the canonical gospels and used only the Aramaic Gospel of the Nazarenes. Unlike the Ebionites, they accepted the Virgin Birth. They considered Jesus as a prophet. 

As late as the eleventh century, Cardinal Humbert of Mourmoutiers still referred to the Nazarene sect as a Sabbath-keeping Christian body existing at that time. Modern scholars believe it is the Pasagini or Pasagians who are referenced by Cardinal Humbert, suggesting the Nazarene sect existed well into the eleventh century and beyond (the Catholic writings of Bonacursus entitled Against the Heretics). It is believed that Gregorius of Bergamo, about 1250 CE, also wrote concerning the Nazarenes as the Pasagians.

Gospel of the Nazarenes

The Gospel of the Nazarenes is the title given to fragments of one of the lost Jewish-Christian Gospels of Matthew partially reconstructed from the writings of Jerome.

Patristic references to "Nazarenes"
In the 4th century, Jerome also refers to Nazarenes as those "who accept Messiah in such a way that they do not cease to observe the old Law." In his Epistle 75, to Augustine, he said:

Jerome viewed a distinction between Nazarenes and Ebionites, a different Jewish sect, but does not comment on whether Nazarene Jews considered themselves to be "Christian" or not or how they viewed themselves as fitting into the descriptions he uses. He clearly equates them with Filaster's Nazarei. His criticism of the Nazarenes is noticeably more direct and critical than that of Epiphanius.

The following creed is from a church at Constantinople at the same period, and condemns practices of the Nazarenes:

"Nazarenes" are referenced past the fourth century CE as well. Jacobus de Voragine (1230–98) described James as a "Nazarene" in The Golden Legend, vol 7. Thomas Aquinas (1225–74) quotes Augustine of Hippo, who was given an apocryphal book called Hieremias (Jeremiah in Latin) by a "Hebrew of the Nazarene Sect", in Catena Aurea — Gospel of Matthew, chapter 27. So this terminology seems to have remained at least through the 13th century in European discussions.

Nazarene beliefs
The beliefs of the Nazarene sect or sects are described through various church fathers and heresiologists.

 in Jesus as Messiah:

 in the Virgin Birth:

 Adhering to circumcision and the Law of Moses:

 Use of Old Testament and New Testament:

 Use of Hebrew and Aramaic New Testament source texts:

Nasoraean Mandaeans

Those few who are initiated into the secrets of the Mandaean religion are called Naṣuraiia or Nasoraeans/Nasaraeans meaning guardians or possessors of secret rites and knowledge. According to the Haran Gawaita, Nasoraean Mandaeans fled Jerusalem before its fall in 70 CE due to persecution by a faction of Jews. The word Naṣuraiia may come from the root n-ṣ-r meaning "to keep", since although they reject the Mosaic Law, they consider themselves to be keepers of Gnosis. Epiphanius mentions a group called Nasaraeans (Νασαραίοι, Part 18 of the Panarion), distinguished from the "Nazoraioi" (Part 29). According to Joseph Lightfoot, Epiphanius also makes a distinction between the Ossaeans and the Nasaraeans, the two main groups within the Essenes:

The Nasaraeans may be the same as the Mandaeans of today. Epiphanius  says (29:6) that they existed before Christ. That is questioned by some, but others accept the pre-Christian origin of this group.

In the Ginza Rabba, the term Nasoraean is used to refer to righteous Mandaeans, i.e., Mandaean priests (comparable to the concept of pneumatikoi in Gnosticism). As Nasoraeans, Mandaeans believe that they constitute the true congregation of bnai nhura'' meaning 'Sons of Light'.

Modern "Nazarene" churches

A number of modern churches use the word "Nazarene" or variants in their name or beliefs:
 The Apostolic Christian Church (Nazarene), originating in the Swiss Nazarene Baptist movement;
 The Church of the Nazarene, a Protestant Christian denomination that was born out of the Holiness Movement of the late 19th and early 20th centuries;

See also 
 Early Christianity
 Essenes
 Jewish Christians
 Judaizers
 Mandaeism
 Messianic Judaism
 St Thomas Christians

References

Further reading

External links
 Netzari Faith 
 Natzraya International - The Sect of the Nazarenes
 Nazarene Judaism
 Catena Aurea - Gospel of Matthew Ch. 27
 Catholic Encyclopedia: Nazarene
 Epiphanius of Salamis' Panarion
 Eusebius of Caesarea's Ecclesiastical History 4.22
 Jerome's Lives of Illustrius Men Ch. 3
 Jewish Encyclopedia: Nazarenes
 Letter 75 Jerome to Augustine
 NetzariPedia: The Term Nazarene Pt1
 The Golden Legend, Regarding St. James the Martyr being a Nazarene

Christianity and Judaism related controversies
Schisms in Christianity
1st-century Christianity
4th-century Christianity
Early Jewish Christian sects
Former Christian denominations
Heresy in ancient Christianity
Mandaeism
Mandaeans